Osów may refer to the following places in Poland:
Osów, Lubusz Voivodeship
Osów, Szczecin